Legislative elections were held in New Caledonia on 7 December 1958. The result was a victory for the Caledonian Union, which won 18 of the 30 seats.

Background
The 1957 elections, the first held under universal suffrage, had been won by the left-wing Caledonian Union, which subsequently formed a government led by Maurice Lenormand.

On 18 June 1958 a protest march was led by right-wing opposition CNRS leader Georges Chatenay, who claimed elections held under universal suffrage were unfair and the new government was placing a financial burden on property owners. Over the next three days, armed members of the CNRS set up roadblocks and detained Assembly members. Supporters of Lenormand attempted to hold a demonstration in Nouméa on 21 June, but were banned from doing so by Governor Aimé Grimald.

Lenormand and his cabinet were subsequently dismissed by Grimald, who took on executive powers.

Electoral system
The 30 members of the Territorial Assembly were elected by open list proportional representation, the same electoral system as used in the 1957 elections.

Results
Voter turnout was around 73%, up 10 percentage points on the previous elections.

Elected members

Aftermath
Following the elections, Lenormand formed an eight-member government, offering two of the portfolios to the opposition.

After Henri Lafleur was elected to the French Senate in 1959, he was replaced by Roger Pêne. When Rock Pidjot and Jean Le Borgne were appointed as ministers, they were replaced by Évenor de Greslan and Gope-Laguise Iekawé. Dick Ukeiwé resigned from the Congress on 30 May 1961 and was replaced by Wandrerine Wainebengo who was next on the party's list.

Following the death of Toutou Tiapi Pimbé on 3 July 1961, he was replaced by Cidopua.

References

New Caledonia
Elections in New Caledonia
1958 in New Caledonia
Election and referendum articles with incomplete results
December 1958 events in Oceania